The Rhodes UFO photos, sometimes called the shoe-heel UFO photos, are two photos that were reportedly taken on July 7, 1947 by amateur astronomer and inventor William Albert Rhodes.  The photographs purport to show a disc-like object flying above Phoenix, Arizona.  Rhodes's account and  photographs were published by the Arizona Republic on July 9.

The photos were included in original saucer witness Kenneth Arnold's 1952 book The Coming of the Saucers, and they were reprinted multiple times by magazine editor and early UFO conspiracy theorist Raymond Palmer.  

Coming just weeks after the Kenneth Arnold report,  the Rhodes photographs were among the very first purported UFO photographs.  The photographs continue to be discussed in the media into the 21st century. Air Force files categorized the Rhodes Photos as a "possible hoax".

Background

On June 24, 1947, civilian pilot Kenneth Arnold reported a sighting of 'flying discs'.  By June 27, disc sightings were being reported nation-wide.

By the second week of July, reports had spread to Arizona.  On July 7, the Arizona Republic reported on Tempe resident Francis Howell who reported seeing a "circular object about two feet in diameter floating to the earth" near his home.  According to Howell, when he approached the object, it "slowly went into the air at a 45-degree angle headed in the direction of Phoenix".  On July 8, the Republic reported on two "silvery balls" in the skies north of Phoenix. The paper claimed the objected were "estimated to be about twice as large as an airplane".

Disc photographs
On July 9, 1947, the Arizona Republic front page featured the photographs along the headline "Mystery 'Whatsis' Photographed over Phoenix". 

The accompanying news article recounted that Rhodes was walking to his home workshop when he heard a heard "whoosh" he believed to be from a P-80 jet propelled plane.  Grabbing a camera,  Rhodes snapped two photos. Rhodes noted that after the initial "whoosh", the object was completely silent.  Rhodes claimed that the object made three passes over his home and left two trails of vapor.

The Republic characterized  the object depicted in the photographs as "the shape of a heel of a shoe, with a small hole in the center".  Rhodes was described as an amateur radio operator and a model airplane manufacturer who was lauded in the model aircraft community for advances in radio controlled model aircraft.

Investigation

On July 8, the FBI obtained copies of the photographs from the managing editor of the Arizona Republic.  On August 29, Rhodes was interviewed by Special Agent Brower of the FBI and George Fugate, Jr. of the Army's Counter Intelligence Corps at Hamilton Field.  Rhodes gave the men photographs and negatives.

Two Air Material officers visited Rhodes in Phoenix.  Files released online in 2015 detailed the official investigation into Rhodes and his photographs.

In 1949, the Air Force internally published its first top-secret study of UFOs, titled Analysis of Flying Object Incidents in the United States;  That report  included the Rhodes photographs.  Project Bluebook labeled the case "Incident 40".

Explanations

Windblown debris
The US Air Force consulted photographic experts who questioned "the possibility of filming such an occurrence under the conditions described", noting that "the object was gray as described, and at a distance of 2000 ft., it seems unlikely that it would appear pure black on the print."   They reported that Rhodes "refers to himself as Chief of Staff of Panoramic Research Laboratory, the letterhead of which lists photography among one of its specialties. Yet, the negative was carelessly  cut and faultily developed. It is covered with streaks and over a period of six months, has faded very noticeably." 
The report noted that "An OSI agent discovered" a letter by Rhodes to Amazing Stories magazine in which Rhodes "requested the advice of the magazine as to how to proceed to sue the Government" for taking the photographs and negatives, despite being "aware of the whereabouts of these pictures" and never having requested their return.  
The report continued "There are other undesirable aspects to this case. The observer's character and business affiliations are presently under investigation, the results of which are not yet known. Dr. Irving Langmuir studied subject photographs, and after learning of the prior passage of a thunderstorm, discounted the photographed object as being merely paper swept up by the winds."

Langmuir later recalled: "Well, they [the SIGN people] had one photograph or two photographs taken by one man. It looked to me like a piece of tar paper when I first saw it and the two photographs showed the thing in entirely different shapes. I asked for more details about it. What was the weather at the time?  Well, they didn't know but they'd look it up. It was taken about fifteen or twenty minutes after a violent thunderstorm out in Ohio. Well, what's more natural than some piece of tar paper picked up by a little miniature twister and being carried a few thousand feet up into the clouds and it was coming down, that's all. So what could it be? 'But it was going at an enormous speed.' Of course the man who saw it didn't have the vaguest idea of how far away it was. That's the trouble. If you see something that's up in the sky, a light or any kind of an object, you haven't the vaguest idea of how big it is. You can guess anything you like about the speed. You ask people how big the moon is. Some say it is as big as your fist, or as big as a baseball. Some say as big as a house.  Well, how big is it really? You can't tell by looking at it."

Intentional hoax
On the same day as Rhodes's supposed sighting,   it was reported that the FBI was investigating a letter received by the Los Angeles Examiner which claimed the discs were atomic-powered Russian craft.   The Examiner turned the letter over to authorities after a recommendation by a "top-flight atomic scientist" who appraised the letter as "not all nonsense".

One historian argues Rhodes faked his photographs based on the Russian craft story:   "The similarities between the images in the Rhodes' photographs and the touted Russian 'invention' are fairly marked. The alleged Russian device was said to be only 18 inches thick and of a kidney-shape outline with the pilot in a prone position while
guiding its flight. Generally, this matches Rhodes' U-shaped object with the 'nonprotruding' canopy, thus was it an accident that the first' good saucer photo compared so well with the supposed Communist design? This could confirm the Russian rumor, or it could mean Rhodes faked his story and pictures since the Soviet
missive saw print the same day as the claimed Phoenix UFO flyby".

Enduring interest
In 1950, writer Gerald Heard authored "The Riddle of the Flying Saucers" which discussed the Rhodes case.  In 1952, the Arizona Republic published an account from a reporter who claimed to have seen a flying disc in 1947 near White Sands – that witness reported "Later, after moving to Phoenix, I was startled to see the tremendous likeness between what I had seen and the object photographed by William A. Rhodes."    In 1998, William Rhodes gave an interview with Phoenix FOX affiliate KSAZ-TV about the photographs he had taken 51 years prior.  The Rhodes photos continued to be discussed by Arizona media into the 21st century.

In Ray Palmer's conspiracy theories

Over the next eleven years, what began as a one-day local news story was transformed into a sweeping conspiracy theory by professional sensationalist Raymond Palmer.

Hollow Earth claims

Since taking over as editor for Amazing Stories magazine in 1938,  Ray Palmer had published stories of visitors from both Outer Space and Inner Earth. 
Palmer's Fate Magazine would later be called "the bible" of the flying disc craze.

In 1945, Palmer published "I Remember Lemuria", a lurid, supposedly-true story of a subterranean alien menace by author Richard Shaver, a "paranoid schizophrenic welder and painter from Wisconsin, who worked at the Ford Motor Company."  

Thereafter, Palmer's publications interpreted UFO reports as proof of Shaver's claims.  Historian Loren Gross writes:"As early as 1946 Palmer published UFO reports in the letters to the editor column of the science fiction pulp Amazing Stories. The Wisconsin editor even suggested a conspiracy of silence concerning the UFO mystery long before the expression "flying saucers" was even coined."  In October 1947, Amazing Stories quoted Shaver: "The discs can be a space invasion, a secret new army plane — or a scouting trip by an enemy country...OR, they can be Shaver's space ships, taking off and landing regularly on earth for centuries past, and seen today as they have always been — as a mystery.  They could be leaving earth with cargos of wonder-mech that to us would mean emancipation from a great many of our worst troubles— and we'll never see those cargos...I predict that nothing more will be seen, and the truth of what the strange disc ships really are will never be disclosed to the common people. We just don't count to the people who do know about such things. It isn't necessary to tell us anything."  In 1948,  the Shaver Mystery Magazine cited Palmer's conspiracy theories about the Rhodes photos experience as further proof of Shaver's claims.

Government cover-up claims
In Spring 1948,  Ray Palmer reprinted the Rhodes photographs in the inaugural issue of his new Fate Magazine, along with the original text from the Arizona Republic.  Palmer questioned whether the pictures had been censored: "Here was proof positive that these objects were not just 'spots before the eyes', but actually flying disks of an aeronautical design unrecognizable by experts.  Those pictures never reached any other newspapers!  Why?   They were the hottest news in the world on July 9.  ...   Was it because the flying disks were a military secret?" 

In 1952, Palmer again reprinted the Rhodes photographs, this time in a privately-published book, The Coming of the Saucers, written in collaboration with original  disc witness Kenneth Arnold.

On November 18, 1958,   Arizona Republic columnist Don Dedera mocked Palmer for his claims that "all the copies of [the 1947 newspaper showing the Rhodes photos] were seized by the army, in a house-to-house canvass and all plates from the newspaper, plus the photo negatives and prints". Dedera explained no such seizure had ever occurred and that in 1947, circulation of the three editions of July 9 had totaled 64,000 copies -- far beyond the number the could be feasibily seized.  The paper explained that Rhodes had voluntarily turned over the pictures to government authorities.  Another commentator, writing in 1988, observed that Palmer's false claim of a house-to-house search "may have sold a lot of magazines but that number couldn't have matched the amount of laughs the claim got in the newsroom of the Republic... There was no way authorities were going to play paperboy in reverse".

Lasting influence
Biographer Fred Nadis argues that "Palmer's greatest impact has been in the murky world of conspiracy theory...  As an early impresario of the paranormal, Palmer shares in much of the credit or the blame for the development of contemporary conspiracy theory culture, particularly its cross-fertilization with popular culture and entertainment. Two sturdy branches of conspiracy theory have Palmer's fingerprints all over them: the flying saucer community's certainty of a governmental cover-up, and the hollow earth tradition" Nadis "specifically highlights the tales of the supposed underground base near Dulce, New Mexico, as a prominent inheritor of the Shaver/Palmer tradition, characterizing Paul Bennewitz’s stories of alien experimentation as 'a dero scene right out of a Shaver story.'"

See also
 McMinnville UFO photographs

References

External links
 Documentation from the National Archives on the Rhodes incident

1947 in Arizona
1947 works
1947 in art
July 1947 events in the United States
Black-and-white photographs
History of Phoenix, Arizona
Photographs of the United States
UFO sightings in the United States
1940s photographs
1947 flying disc craze
Hoaxes in the United States